During the 1999–2000 English football season, Wrexham F.C. competed in the Football League Second Division.

Season summary
In the 1999-2000 season, Wrexham had a satisfying league campaign finishing mid-table in 11th place. The season also saw Wrexham again beat a top-flight team in the FA Cup, this time in the shape of Middlesbrough. The final score of the match was 2–1, with the second half goals coming from Robin Gibson and Darren Ferguson after being behind to the Premiership outfit.

Final league table

Results
Wrexham's score comes first

Legend

Football League Second Division

FA Cup

League Cup

Football League Trophy

Squad

Left club during season

References

1999-2000
Welsh football clubs 1999–2000 season
1999–2000 Football League Second Division by team